General Sir James Charles Chatterton, 3rd Baronet,  (10 December 17945 January 1874) was a British Army officer and politician; he was the third and last of the Chatterton baronets of Castle Mahon. He fought during both the Peninsular and Waterloo Campaigns, later becoming Member of Parliament (MP) for Cork, Ireland.

Life
The second son of Sir James Chatterton, 1st Baronet, and his wife Rebecca Lane, he joined the 12th Light Dragoons in 1809 and took part in the subsequent Peninsular War (1807–1814). He saw action at the sieges of Ciudad Rodrigo and Badajoz and the battles of Salamanca, Vittoria, Nivelle and the Nive as well as other minor actions. For his services in the Peninsular, Chatterton received the Army Gold Medal with seven clasps.

In June 1815 he fought at the battles of Quatre Bras and Waterloo then took part in the subsequent advance on and capture of Paris. After hostilities ceased he remained in France with the Army of Occupation.

At the 1838 Coronation of Queen Victoria, Chatterton commanded the 4th Dragoon Guards, and received a special gold medal. At the Duke of Wellington's funeral he carried the "Great Banner," at the Queen's request, "in consideration of his long, faithful, and distinguished services".

Chatterton sat as MP for Cork from 1831–45 and from 1849–52; he was High Sheriff from 1851-2. A 33° degree Freemason, in 1849 he was installed as Provincial Grand Master of South Munster.

In 1855 he succeeded to the Chatterton baronetcy on the death of his brother William Abraham, 2nd Baronet. He was Colonel of the 5th Royal Irish Lancers from 1858 to 1868.

Family

In 1825 he married Anne, youngest daughter of James Atkinson of Lendale, Yorkshire, and had a son who died in infancy,
James-William-Acheson (1826-1827). On his death the title became extinct.

He is buried with his wife in Brookwood Cemetery.

Arms

References

Bibliography

1794 births
1874 deaths
British Army personnel of the French Revolutionary Wars
British Army commanders of the Napoleonic Wars
British Army generals
Knights Grand Cross of the Order of the Bath
Recipients of the Army Gold Medal
Recipients of the Waterloo Medal
Younger sons of baronets
Baronets in the Baronetage of the United Kingdom
High Sheriffs of County Cork
British Freemasons
Burials at Brookwood Cemetery